Barton Regis was, from 1894 to 1904, a rural district in the English administrative county of Gloucestershire, adjacent to the City of Bristol.

Formation
The rural district was formed by the Local Government Act 1894 as successor to the Barton Regis Rural Sanitary District, which had taken its name from the ancient hundred of Barton Regis, albeit with quite different boundaries.  A directly elected rural district council (RDC) replaced the rural sanitary authority consisting of the poor law guardians for the area. The RDC was based in the offices of the poor law guardians in the Eastville area of Bristol.

Parishes
The rural district consisted of six civil parishes:
Filton
Henbury
Shirehampton
Stoke Gifford
Westbury-on-Trym
Winterbourne

Abolition
In November 1903 Bristol Corporation promoted a private act of parliament to extend the area of the city to include the parishes of Shirehampton and Westbury-on-Trym, and part of the parish of Henbury, as well as the neighbouring Horfield Urban District. As a consequence it was proposed to dissolve the Barton Regis Rural District and distribute its area between the Chipping Sodbury and Thornbury rural districts.

The Bristol Corporation Act 1904 (c. ccxxiii) took effect on 1 October 1904. Shirehampton and Westbury-on-Trym were added to the city, Filton, Stoke Gifford and Winterbourne parishes were transferred to Chipping Sodbury RD, while the parish of Henbury was transferred to Thornbury RD.

References

History of Gloucestershire
Districts of England created by the Local Government Act 1894
Rural districts of England
History of Bristol